Kenny Roberts (born May 12, 1978) is a Seychellois former swimmer, who specialized in sprint freestyle, but also competed in breaststroke and in individual medley. He represented the Seychelles in all three editions of the Olympic Games, since the nation made its comeback in 1992. While studying in the United States, he played for the Bolles School's Sharks Club, under head coach Gregg Troy, and later for the Clemson University's swimming and diving team, also known as the Clemson Tigers. Currently, Roberts is appointed as the chairman of the Seychelles Swimming Association (SSA).

Roberts made his official debut, as a 14-year-old, at the 1992 Summer Olympics in Barcelona. He failed to reach the top 16 final in any of his individual events, finishing sixty-eighth in the 50 m freestyle (26.78), seventy-second in the 100 m freestyle (58.86), fifty-eighth in the 100 m breaststroke (1:16.52), and fifty-first in the 200 m individual medley (2:30.35). He was also disqualified in the 200 m breaststroke for an illegal dolphin kick during the race.

At the 1996 Summer Olympics in Atlanta, Roberts drastically shortened his program, swimming only in the 100 m freestyle. He placed fifty-second on the morning prelims in a Seychellois record of 52.89.

Three years later, at the 1999 All-Africa Games in Johannesburg, South Africa, Roberts collected two bronze medals for Seychelles each in the 200 m individual medley (2:11.00), and in the 400 m individual medley (4:46.26).

Eight years after competing in his first Olympics, Roberts swam for the third time in the 100 m freestyle, as a 22-year-old, at the 2000 Summer Olympics in Sydney. He achieved a FINA B-cut of 52.59 from the All-Africa Games. He challenged seven other swimmers in heat three, including Trinidad and Tobago's 16-year-old George Bovell. Coming from sixth on the initial length, Roberts faded down the stretch to pick up a seventh seed in a time of 53.91, just 1.32 seconds below his entry standard. Roberts failed to advance into the semifinals for his third Olympic run, as he placed sixty-first overall in the prelims.

References

1978 births
Living people
Seychellois male swimmers
Olympic swimmers of Seychelles
Swimmers at the 1992 Summer Olympics
Swimmers at the 1996 Summer Olympics
Swimmers at the 2000 Summer Olympics
Seychellois male freestyle swimmers
Male breaststroke swimmers
Male medley swimmers
People from Greater Victoria, Seychelles
Clemson Tigers men's swimmers
Clemson University alumni
African Games bronze medalists for Seychelles
African Games medalists in swimming
Competitors at the 1999 All-Africa Games